Kanté is a surname. Notable people with the surname include:

 Aboubakary Kanté (born 1994), Gambian-French footballer
 Cédric Kanté (born 1979), Malian-French footballer
 Daouda Kanté (born 1978), Malian footballer
 Guyan Kanté (born 1982), Ivorian footballer
 José Kanté Martínez (born 1990), Spanish footballer
 Koly Kanté (born 1982), Malian footballer
 Lamine Kanté (born 1987), French basketball player
 Manuel Kanté (born 1986), French footballer
 Massiré Kanté (born 1989), French footballer
 Mohamed T. Kanté (born 1985), Malian-American technologist and social entrepreneur
 Mory Kanté (born 1997), Guinean footballer
 Mory Kanté (1950-2020), Guinean-Malian musician
 N'Golo Kanté (born 1991), French footballer
 Ousmane Kanté (born 1989), Guinean-French footballer
 Seydou Badjan Kanté (born 1981), Ivorian footballer
 Soumaoro Kanté (13th century), king of the Sosso people
 Youssouf Kanté (born 1984), French footballer